Kära vinter is the fourth studio album from Swedish singer and model Måns Zelmerlöw. It was released on 19 December 2011 in Sweden, and is a Christmas album. The album failed to chart on the Swedish Albums Chart upon release, but debuted on the chart at number 41 in 2019.

Track listing

Charts

Release history

References

2011 Christmas albums
Christmas albums by Swedish artists
Pop Christmas albums
Måns Zelmerlöw albums
Warner Music Sweden albums